Politics of Lesotho takes place in a framework of a parliamentary representative democratic constitutional monarchy, whereby the Prime Minister of Lesotho is the head of government, and of a  multi-party system. Executive power is exercised by the government. Legislative power is vested in both the government and the two chambers of Parliament, the Senate and the National Assembly. The Judiciary is independent of the executive and the legislature.

Executive branch

|King
|Letsie III
|
|7 February 1996
|-
|Prime Minister
|Sam Matekane
|Revolution for Prosperity
|28 October 2022
|}
The Lesotho Government is a constitutional monarchy. The Prime Minister, Sam Matekane, is head of government and has executive authority. The King serves a largely ceremonial function; he no longer possesses any executive authority and is proscribed from actively participating in political initiatives. According to the constitution, the leader of the majority party in the assembly automatically becomes prime minister; the monarch is hereditary, but, under the terms of the constitution which came into effect after the March 1993 election, the monarch is a "living symbol of national unity" with no executive or legislative powers; under traditional law the college of chiefs has the power to determine who is next in the line of succession, who shall serve as regent in the event that the successor is not of mature age, and may even depose the monarch.

Legislative branch
Parliament has two chambers. The National Assembly has 120 members, elected for a five-year term, 80 in single-seat constituencies and 40 by proportional representation. The Senate has 33 nominated members.

Political parties and elections

General elections

Judicial branch
The constitution provides for an independent hierarchical judicial system. The judiciary is made up of the High Court of Lesotho, the Court of Appeal, magistrate's courts, and traditional (customary) courts which exist predominantly in rural areas. There is no trial by jury; rather, judges make rulings alone, or, in the case of criminal trials, with two other judges as observers. The constitution also protects basic civil liberties, including freedom of speech, association, and the press; freedom of peaceful assembly; and freedom of religion.

The Court of Appeal is located in Maseru and consists of a President and 6 justices of Appeal.

The High Court has unlimited original jurisdiction over civil and criminal matters, as well as appellate jurisdiction from the lower courts and comprises a Chief Justice and other puisne judges. Parallel to the High Court is the Labour Court, which is a specialist court dealing exclusively with industrial and labour matters.

Magistrates Courts are presided over by judicial officers (magistrates) employed as civil servants. They are not courts of record and as such their decisions are not binding on future cases.

The Chief Justice and Justices of the Court of Appeal are appointed by the King on the advice of the Prime Minister. Puisne judges of the High Court are appointed by the King on the advice of the Judicial Service Commission. High Court judges may retire any time after attaining the age of 75 but may be removed from office by the King for malfeasance or infirmity.

Chief Justices
 c. 1968–>1970 Hendrik Rudolf Jacobs (South African)
 1974–1975 Joas Tseliso Mapetla
 1976–?1986 Taufik Suliman Cotran (afterwards Chief Justice of Belize, 1986)
 1987–1991 Brendan Peter Cullinan
 <1994–2002 Joseph Lebona Kheola
 2002–2004 Mahapela Lehohla
 2004 Baptista Molai (acting)
 2013 Tseliso Monaphathi (acting)
 2014-date Nthomeng Majara

Administrative divisions
For administrative purposes, Lesotho is divided into 10 districts, each headed by a district secretary and a district military officer appointed by the central government and the RLDF, respectively.
The districts are: Berea, Butha-Buthe, Leribe, Mafeteng, Maseru, Mohales Hoek, Mokhotlong, Qacha's Nek, Quthing, Thaba-Tseka

International organization participation
Lesotho is member of ACP, AfDB, C, CCC, ECA, FAO, G-77, IBRD, ICAO, ICC, ICRM, IDA, IFAD, IFC, IFRCS, ILO, IMF, Intelsat (nonsignatory user), Interpol, IOC, ITU, NAM, OAU, OPCW, SACU, SADC, United Nations, UNCTAD, UNESCO, UNHCR, UNIDO, UPU, WCL, WFTU, WHO, WIPO, WMO, WToO, WTrO

Notes and references

Literature

K. Matlosa Electoral System Design and Conflict Mitigation: the Case of Lesotho // Democracy, Conflict and Human Security